Lophornis is a genus of hummingbird in the family Trochilidae. These are all tiny birds, ranking among the smallest hummingbirds. No species exceeds  and most are under  in total length, weighing 3 grams or less. The male coquettes are noted from their outlandish, colorful crests and markings, the females being more subdued.

Taxonomy and species list
The genus Lophornis was introduced by the French naturalist René Lesson in 1829. The type species was subsequently designated as the tufted coquette (Lophornis ornatus). The generic name combines the Ancient Greek lophos meaning "crest" or "tuft" with ornis meaning "bird".

The genus contains the following eleven species:

References

 
Taxonomy articles created by Polbot
Higher-level bird taxa restricted to the Neotropics
Taxa named by René Lesson